Geneviève Domken defeated B Wallen in the final, 6–1, 6–4 to win the inaugural Girls' Singles tennis title at the 1947 Wimbledon Championships.

Draw

Final

Group A

Group B

References

External links

Girls' Singles
Wimbledon Championship by year – Girls' singles
Wimbledon Championships
Wimbledon Championships